Zonkey may refer to:

 Zonkey (zebroid), a donkey crossed with a zebra
 Zonkey (Tijuana), donkeys painted with zebra stripes in Tijuana, Mexico
 The Tijuana Zonkeys basketball team
 Zonkey (album), an Umphrey's McGee album